Gornji Kozji Dol is a village in the municipality of Trgovište, in south-eastern Serbia. As of the 2002 census, the village had a population of 101.

References

Populated places in Pčinja District